Massimo Sacchetti is an eclectic contemporary Italian artist from the Italian Alps of Aosta Valley, Italy and has exhibited over the years in various important locations in Italy, Finland, Great Britain, the United States, Germany and France. He is a Lecturer at the Art School of Aosta and he has been collaborating for years with numerous art and design institutes.

The protagonist of Sacchetti's works is Nature, almost a tribute to the Aosta Valley, through its landscapes, caught in the changing of the seasons, which push the observer to reflect on the beauty of the places of the heart and memory, often only evoked by traits, lines and symbols, suspended between abstractionism and symbolism.

He uses all the techniques: drawing, painting, sculpture, graphics, photography and 3D videography. The last two decades are marked by numerous collaborations in internationally important exhibition spaces such as the Lathi Art Tadai Museum, in Finland, the Art Ville de Meyzieu, Lyon, the MACRO Museum of Contemporary Art Rome and Triennale in Milan.

He has been active from at least 1974 who recently had an exhibition of his art at the Palazzo Rosso art museum in Genoa.

Exhibitions 

PERSONAL EXHIBITIONS

COLLECTIVE EXHIBITIONS

References

Living people
Year of birth missing (living people)
Italian artists
Place of birth missing (living people)

External links 
 Website of Artist http://www.massimosacchetti.it/en/